Shi Yuejun (5 March 1971 – 20 December 2006) was a Chinese mass murderer and spree killer known as the "Jilin butcher", who murdered 12 people and wounded five others in Liuhe County and Tonghua County, Jilin Province between 24 September and 29 September 2006. He was sentenced to death on 25 November the same year and executed about a month later.

Life
Shi was born in Liuhe County, China, on 5 March 1971. He was a resident of Tonggou village in Liunan Township and worked as a butcher. His wife described him as an introverted person who was unwilling to interact with other people, and was prone to brooding after conflicts with others.

Two months prior to the murders, he visited a psychiatrist in Tonghua, which improved his mood, and he and his wife afterwards made trips to Shanghai, Suzhou, and Hangzhou.

Murders
On the morning of 24 September 2006, Shi drove to Ermi in Tonghua County where he killed Li Zhenjun in his home, as well as Wang Yuliang, a health inspector who had once punished him. He also killed Wang's wife and parents, and wounded Wang Yuhong, one of Wang's relatives, with a stab wound to the abdomen, when he tried to intervene and attacked Shi with a shovel. Shi then drove to Liunan Township in Liuhe County, where he killed shop owner Liu Guohua, who had refused to sell his meat. He also wounded Liu's wife, as well as a man named Wang Gangyin, who had paid him low wages. He then proceeded to Sanyuanpu, where he killed shop owner and slaughterhouse supervisor Yu Hongyong, who had also punished him, wounded Yu's wife, and then fled.

Shi was soon identified by police as the culprit, roadblocks were set up in the area, and a reward of 100,000 yuan was offered by Tonghua police for clues about the murderer's whereabouts. On 27 September, Shi murdered Sun Honglian and his wife, who were living secluded on a mountain near Tonggou and escaped again, while 2,000 police officers rushed to the crime scene. On 28 September, the Ministry of Public Security issued a Class-A warrant and offered a reward of 50,000 yuan for information that would lead to his arrest.

Being hunted by 2,000 police officers and 12,000 other people, including militia, armed police, and local residents, Shi killed three villagers and wounded another in Lujiabao near Liunan Township in the morning of September 29. He was eventually captured in a nearby cornfield around noon on the same day. He was brought to Changchun, where he confessed to the murders.

Shi, who was said to have had psychological problems, described his motive as "revenge for the humiliations that he suffered by the society".

Victims

Killed

Wounded
 Wang Yuhong
 Liu Guohua's wife
 Wang Gangyin
 Yu Hongyong's wife
 An unnamed person

Trial and execution
After pleading guilty to the murder spree, Shi was convicted of intentional homicide and sentenced to death on 25 November 2006. He was executed at Tonghua on 20 December of that same year.

References

External links
石悦军资料, Sina.com
视频：吉林通化特大杀人犯石悦军被抓获, Sina.com (29 September 2006)

1971 births
2006 deaths
2006 murders in China
21st-century Chinese criminals
21st-century executions by China
Chinese butchers
Chinese male criminals
Chinese mass murderers
Chinese people convicted of murder
Chinese spree killers
Executed mass murderers
Executed people from Jilin
Executed People's Republic of China people
Executed spree killers
Family murders
Male murderers
21st-century mass murder in China
Mass stabbings in China
People convicted of murder by the People's Republic of China
People executed by China by firearm
People from Tonghua